Zsuzsanna Csobánki (born 28 March 1983 in Budapest) is a female Hungarian swimmer, who competed for her native country at the 2004 Summer Olympics in Athens, Greece.

References
sports-reference

1983 births
Living people
Hungarian female freestyle swimmers
Olympic swimmers of Hungary
Swimmers from Budapest
Swimmers at the 2004 Summer Olympics
20th-century Hungarian women
21st-century Hungarian women